El Cimarron can be:

El Cimarrón (Henze), a 1970 musical composition by Hans Werner Henze
El Cimarrón (film), a 2007 film

es:Cimarrón (desambiguación)